Jason John Richards (10 April 1976 – 15 December 2011) was a New Zealand motor racing driver. A multiple championship winning driver in his homeland in the New Zealand Touring Car Championship, he moved to Australia to pursue a career in the Australian-based V8 Supercar Championship Series. Richards career highlights include finishing second three times in V8 Supercar's most famous race, the Bathurst 1000. Richards died at the age of 35, just over a year after being diagnosed with cancer.

Early career
Richards started his motor racing career at the age of eight in 1985, driving in karting events in his home country of New Zealand. He made his move out of karting in 1993 after 35 championship titles, entering the Mini 7s.

After much success again, Richards was offered the Canterbury Racing School Formula Ford drive for the Nissan Mobil 500 meetings at Wellington and Pukekohe.

After a short stint in the English Formula Ford Championship, Richards returned to New Zealand to sign with BMW Motorsport NZ as junior driver, winning the 1995/96 Class 1 Touring Car Championships for the team, along with nine out of 12 series races.

V8 Supercar

Team Kiwi Racing
Promoted to lead driver, Richards won the next three NZ Touring Car Championships prior to joining Team Kiwi for the V8 Supercar series in Australia in 2001. Battling testing restrictions and the tyranny of distance, Richards finished an extremely creditable 19th in the 2002 V8 Supercar Series.

Team Dynamik
Richards moved to the new South Australian Team Dynamik in 2003, putting in some strong results, including a narrow failure to snatch victory in the Sandown 500 from Mark Skaife in the race's dying stages.

Tasman Motorsport
He then made the decision to move to the newly formed Tasman Motorsport outfit in 2004 and has developed into a driver who believes he is capable of standing on the top step of a V8 Supercar podium.

Coming back from a major rollover in the 2005 round at Queensland Raceway, Richards quickly returned to stride and promptly placed the repaired Commodore into the top 10 in the following round at Oran Park Raceway.

His podium results in the Sandown and Bathurst endurance events in 2005 helped cement his place as a 'coming man' of the V8 Supercar category. In the 2005 Supercheap Auto 1000, Richards produced a strong performance and came very close to winning the race.

In the following year, Richards won the second of three races at the Winton Motor Raceway, hence gaining his first (and only) V8 Supercars race victory. He finished the season in 18th position.

At the 2007 Bathurst 1000 Richards and Murphy were the best placed Holden team, finishing fourth overall. Surfers Paradise was his best round in 2007 where he finished third overall, and finished 14th in the Championship, with 235 points 15 points behind teammate Greg Murphy.

Brad Jones Racing
Richards joined Brad Jones Racing VE Commodore in 2009, driving the #8 car. (who ran a new race number for the team in V8 Supercars but was the racing number of team co-principal Brad Jones during the team's years racing in AUSCAR and NASCAR at the Calder Park Thunderdome) Richards secured his first V8 Supercar pole position at Hidden Valley Raceway in 2009.
Richards finished third at the 2010 L&H 500 with Andrew Jones.

Illness and death
In November 2010 it was revealed that Richards was admitted to hospital on 16 November and was later diagnosed with an adrenocortical carcinoma. Richards immediately stepped away from racing to devote his energies to fighting the illness with Andrew Jones substituting for the balance of the 2010 season. He continued to race sporadically with guest appearances in the second-tier V8 Supercar series, Australian GT Championship, Touring Car Masters and continued testing with Brad Jones Racing into the second half of 2011. He died on 15 December 2011 at his home.

In 2012 an illustrated documentary of his life was released.

Career results

Complete Bathurst 1000 results

* Super Touring race

Legacy

Jason Richards Memorial Trophy

Since 2013, the driver who scores the most points across all races during the weekend of the New Zealand round of the V8 Supercars championship has received the Jason Richards Memorial Trophy. The trophy was introduced when the series returned to Pukekohe in 2013, replacing the Mark Porter Memorial Trophy presented at the Hamilton 400.

Jason Bright and Brad Jones Racing, Richards' last teammate and team respectively, were the first winners of the trophy. In 2015 and 2017, Jamie Whincup, who was a teammate of Richards in 2005 at Tasman Motorsport and co-drove with him to a second-place finish at the 2005 Bathurst 1000, won the trophy.

Winners

References

External links
 Driver Database stats
 Motorsport.com articles and photos
 VESRIX V8 Supercar stats
 Speedcafe.com Tribute
 Jason Richards "In his own words" - Interview Speedcafe 19 December 2011

Supercars Championship drivers
1976 births
2011 deaths
New Zealand racing drivers
Sportspeople from Nelson, New Zealand
Deaths from cancer in Victoria (Australia)
Deaths from adrenocortical cancer
People educated at Waimea College